Louisiana Physician Consulting is an organization created to provide Louisiana Physicians with current areas of malpractice risk management as well as practice consulting. The organization was created by a retired physician, Kenneth Rhea, M.D. in New Orleans, La after many years of consulting work with the Non-Profit Insurance Company, LAMMICO (Louisiana Medical Mutual Insurance Company). Dr. Rhea is a widely published author of articles on the area of Malpractice Liability and is certified to grant Continued Medical Education Contact hours for physicians and registered nurses attending his programs.

The Senior Medical Risk Manager, Curtis C Gunter, M.S./Health Care,  has also spoken widely on areas of risk to health care practitioners and has published over fifty articles on this area of health care. A few of the titles Gunter has published are, Instrumentation Litigation,  When patients refuse blood transfusions  A Study of Why Patients Sue, Communicate or Litigate and  The Care and Feeding of a Health Practice.

References 
 LAMMICO October Newsletter 10/13/1999
 Illinois Medicine ISMIE Update, 2/25,1994

Non-profit organizations based in Louisiana